Steen Nedergaard (born 25 February 1970 in Aalborg, Denmark) is a Danish former professional footballer who played in the full-back position.

Nedergaard spent the larger part of his career in Denmark with Odense BK. He gained 14 caps for the Danish under-21 national side, and was lauded as 1990 Danish under-21 Player of the Year. In the summer of 2000, he signed a three-year contract with Norwich City F.C. in England. His first season was wrecked by injuries, however in his second season he found good form and came second in the vote for Norwich City player of the year. The team reached the final of the English Division One play-offs, however Nedergaard missed the play-off matches after suffering another injury.

At the end of his third season in England, Nedergaard opted to return to Denmark and signed again for Odense BK. He maintained connections with Norwich City and was instrumental in persuading compatriot Thomas Helveg to return to Odense in the summer of 2004.

From 2005 to 2006 he was the manager of Hvidovre IF.

External links
Danish national team profile
Career Information at 'Flown from the Nest' website
Career stats at Soccerbase

Other sources
Canary Citizens by Mark Davage, John Eastwood, Kevin Platt, published by Jarrold Publishing, (2001),

References

1970 births
Norwich City F.C. players
Danish men's footballers
Denmark under-21 international footballers
Odense Boldklub players
Hvidovre IF players
Living people
Sportspeople from Aalborg
Association football defenders
Dalum IF players